The theory of Forms or theory of Ideas is a philosophical theory attributed to Plato, that the physical world is not as real or true as timeless, absolute, unchangeable ideas. According to this theory, ideas in this sense, often capitalized and translated as "Ideas" or "Forms", are the non-physical essences of all things, of which objects and matter in the physical world are merely imitations. Plato speaks of these entities only through the characters (primarily Socrates) of his dialogues who sometimes suggests that these Forms are the only objects of study that can provide knowledge. The theory itself is contested from within Plato's dialogues, and it is a general point of controversy in philosophy.  Nonetheless, the theory is considered to be a classical solution to the problem of universals.

The early Greek concept of form precedes attested philosophical usage and is represented by a number of words mainly having to do with vision, sight, and appearance. Plato uses these aspects of sight and appearance from the early Greek concept of the form in his dialogues to explain the Forms and the Good.

Forms
The original meaning of the term  (eidos), "visible form", and related terms μορφή (morphē), "shape", and φαινόμενα (phainomena), "appearances", from φαίνω (phainō), "shine", Indo-European *bʰeh₂- or *bhā- remained stable over the centuries until the beginning of Western philosophy, when they became equivocal, acquiring additional specialized philosophic meanings. Plato used the terms eidos and idea (ἰδέα) interchangeably.

The pre-Socratic philosophers, starting with Thales, noted that appearances change, and began to ask what the thing that changes "really" is. The answer was substance, which stands under the changes and is the actually existing thing being seen. The status of appearances now came into question. What is the form really and how is that related to substance?

The Forms are expounded upon in Plato's dialogues and general speech, in that every object or quality in reality—dogs, human beings, mountains, colors, courage, love, and goodness—has a form. Form answers the question, "What is that?" Plato was going a step further and asking what Form itself is. He supposed that the object was essentially or "really" the Form and that the phenomena were mere shadows mimicking the Form; that is, momentary portrayals of the Form under different circumstances. The problem of universals – how can one thing in general be many things in particular – was solved by presuming that Form was a distinct singular thing but caused plural representations of itself in particular objects. For example, in the dialogue Parmenides, Socrates states: "Nor, again, if a person were to show that all is one by partaking of one, and at the same time many by partaking of many, would that be very astonishing. But if he were to show me that the absolute one was many, or the absolute many one, I should be truly amazed." Matter is considered particular in itself. For Plato, forms, such as beauty, are more real than any objects that imitate them. Though the forms are timeless and unchanging, physical things are in a constant change of existence. Where forms are unqualified perfection, physical things are qualified and conditioned.

These Forms are the essences of various objects: they are that without which a thing would not be the kind of thing it is. For example, there are countless tables in the world but the Form of tableness is at the core; it is the essence of all of them. Plato's Socrates held that the world of Forms is transcendent to our own world (the world of substances) and also is the essential basis of reality. Super-ordinate to matter, Forms are the most pure of all things. Furthermore, he believed that true knowledge/intelligence is the ability to grasp the world of Forms with one's mind.

A Form is aspatial (transcendent to space) and atemporal (transcendent to time). In the world of Plato, atemporal means that it does not exist within any time period, rather it provides the formal basis for time.  It therefore formally grounds beginning, persisting and ending. It is neither eternal in the sense of existing forever, nor mortal, of limited duration. It exists transcendent to time altogether. Forms are aspatial in that they have no spatial dimensions, and thus no orientation in space, nor do they even (like the point) have a location. They are non-physical, but they are not in the mind. Forms are extra-mental (i.e. real in the strictest sense of the word).

A Form is an objective "blueprint" of perfection. The Forms are perfect and unchanging representations of objects and qualities. For example, the Form of beauty or the Form of a triangle. For the form of a triangle say there is a triangle drawn on a blackboard. A triangle is a polygon with 3 sides. The triangle as it is on the blackboard is far from perfect. However, it is only the intelligibility of the Form "triangle" that allows us to know the drawing on the chalkboard is a triangle, and the Form "triangle" is perfect and unchanging. It is exactly the same whenever anyone chooses to consider it; however, time only affects the observer and not the triangle. It follows that the same attributes would exist for the Form of beauty and for all Forms.

Plato explains how we are always many steps away from the idea or Form. The idea of a perfect circle can have us defining, speaking, writing, and drawing about particular circles that are always steps away from the actual being. The perfect circle, partly represented by a curved line, and a precise definition, cannot be drawn. Even the ratio of pi is an irrational number, that only partly helps to fully describe the perfect circle. The idea of the perfect circle is discovered, not invented.

Intelligible realm and separation of the Forms
Plato often invokes, particularly in his dialogues Phaedo, Republic and Phaedrus, poetic language to illustrate the mode in which the Forms are said to exist. Near the end of the Phaedo, for example, Plato describes the world of Forms as a pristine region of the physical universe located above the surface of the Earth (Phd. 109a–111c). In the Phaedrus the Forms are in a "place beyond heaven" (huperouranios topos) (Phdr. 247c ff); and in the Republic the sensible world is contrasted with the intelligible realm (noēton topon) in the famous Allegory of the Cave.

It would be a mistake to take Plato's imagery as positing the intelligible world as a literal physical space apart from this one.  Plato emphasizes that the Forms are not beings that extend in space (or time), but subsist apart from any physical space whatsoever. Thus we read in the Symposium of the Form of Beauty: "It is not anywhere in another thing, as in an animal, or in earth, or in heaven, or in anything else, but itself by itself with itself," (211b). And in the Timaeus Plato writes: "Since these things are so, we must agree that that which keeps its own form unchangingly, which has not been brought into being and is not destroyed, which neither receives into itself anything else from anywhere else, nor itself enters into anything anywhere, is one thing," (52a, emphasis added).

Ambiguities of the theory

Plato's conception of Forms actually differs from dialogue to dialogue, and in certain respects it is never fully explained, so many aspects of the theory are open to interpretation. Forms are first introduced in the Phaedo, but in that dialogue the concept is simply referred to as something the participants are already familiar with, and the theory itself is not developed. Similarly, in the Republic, Plato relies on the concept of Forms as the basis of many of his arguments but feels no need to argue for the validity of the theory itself or to explain precisely what Forms are. Commentators have been left with the task of explaining what Forms are and how visible objects participate in them, and there has been no shortage of disagreement. Some scholars advance the view that Forms are paradigms, perfect examples on which the imperfect world is modeled. Others interpret Forms as universals, so that the Form of Beauty, for example, is that quality that all beautiful things share. Yet others interpret Forms as "stuffs," the conglomeration of all instances of a quality in the visible world. Under this interpretation, we could say there is a little beauty in one person, a little beauty in another – all the beauty in the world put together is the Form of Beauty. Plato himself was aware of the ambiguities and inconsistencies in his Theory of Forms, as is evident from the incisive criticism he makes of his own theory in the Parmenides.

Evidence of Forms

Human perception
In Cratylus, Plato writes:But if the very nature of knowledge changes, at the time when the change occurs there will be no knowledge, and, according to this view, there will be no one to know and nothing to be known: but if that which knows and that which is known exist ever, and the beautiful and the good and every other thing also exist, then I do not think that they can resemble a process of flux, as we were just now supposing.

Plato believed that long before our bodies ever existed, our souls existed and inhabited heaven, where they became directly acquainted with the forms themselves. Real knowledge, to him, was knowledge of the forms. But knowledge of the forms cannot be gained through sensory experience because the forms are not in the physical world. Therefore, our real knowledge of the forms must be the memory of our initial acquaintance with the forms in heaven. Therefore, what we seem to learn is in fact just remembering.

Perfection
No one has ever seen a perfect circle, nor a perfectly straight line, yet everyone knows what a circle and a straight line are. Plato uses the tool-maker's blueprint as evidence that Forms are real:... when a man has discovered the instrument which is naturally adapted to each work, he must express this natural form, and not others which he fancies, in the material ....

Perceived circles or lines are not exactly circular or straight, and true circles and lines could never be detected since by definition they are sets of infinitely small points. But if the perfect ones were not real, how could they direct the manufacturer?

Criticisms of Platonic Forms

Self-criticism
One difficulty lies in the conceptualization of the "participation" of an object in a form (or Form). The young Socrates conceives of his solution to the problem of the universals in another metaphor:
Nay, but the idea may be like the day which is one and the same in many places at once, and yet continuous with itself; in this way each idea may be one and the same in all at the same time.

But exactly how is a Form like the day in being everywhere at once? The solution calls for a distinct form, in which the particular instances, which are not identical to the form, participate; i.e., the form is shared out somehow like the day to many places. The concept of "participate", represented in Greek by more than one word, is as obscure in Greek as it is in English. Plato hypothesized that distinctness meant existence as an independent being, thus opening himself to the famous third man argument of Parmenides, which proves that forms cannot independently exist and be participated.

If universal and particulars – say man or greatness – all exist and are the same then the Form is not one but is multiple. If they are only like each other then they contain a form that is the same and others that are different. Thus if we presume that the Form and a particular are alike then there must be another, or third Form, man or greatness by possession of which they are alike. An infinite regression would then result; that is, an endless series of third men. The ultimate participant, greatness, rendering the entire series great, is missing. Moreover, any Form is not unitary but is composed of infinite parts, none of which is the proper Form.

The young Socrates did not give up the Theory of Forms over the Third Man but took another tack, that the particulars do not exist as such. Whatever they are, they "mime" the Forms, appearing to be particulars. This is a clear dip into representationalism, that we cannot observe the objects as they are in themselves but only their representations. That view has the weakness that if only the mimes can be observed then the real Forms cannot be known at all and the observer can have no idea of what the representations are supposed to represent or that they are representations.

Socrates' later answer would be that men already know the Forms because they were in the world of Forms before birth. The mimes only recall these Forms to memory.

Aristotelian criticism

The topic of Aristotle's criticism of Plato's Theory of Forms is a large one and continues to expand. Rather than quote Plato, Aristotle often summarized. Classical commentaries thus recommended Aristotle as an introduction to Plato, even when in disagreement; the Platonist Syrianus used Aristotelian critiques to further refine the Platonic position on forms in use in his school, a position handed down to his student Proclus. As a historian of prior thought, Aristotle was invaluable, however this was secondary to his own dialectic and in some cases he treats purported implications as if Plato had actually mentioned them, or even defended them. In examining Aristotle's criticism of The Forms, it is helpful to understand Aristotle's own hylomorphic forms, by which he intends to salvage much of Plato's theory.

Plato distinguished between real and non-real "existing things", where the latter term is used of substance. The figures that the artificer places in the gold are not substance, but gold is. Aristotle stated that, for Plato, all things studied by the sciences have Form and asserted that Plato considered only substance to have Form. Uncharitably, this leads him to something like a contradiction: Forms existing as the objects of science, but not-existing as substance. Scottish philosopher W.D. Ross objects to this as a mischaracterization of Plato.

Plato did not claim to know where the line between Form and non-Form is to be drawn. As Cornford points out, those things about which the young Socrates (and Plato) asserted "I have often been puzzled about these things" (in reference to Man, Fire and Water), appear as Forms in later works. However, others do not, such as Hair, Mud, Dirt. Of these, Socrates is made to assert, "it would be too absurd to suppose that they have a Form."

Ross also objects to Aristotle's criticism that Form Otherness accounts for the differences between Forms and purportedly leads to contradictory forms: the Not-tall, the Not-beautiful, etc. That particulars participate in a Form is for Aristotle much too vague to permit analysis. By one way in which he unpacks the concept, the Forms would cease to be of one essence due to any multiple participation. As Ross indicates, Plato didn't make that leap from "A is not B" to "A is Not-B." Otherness would only apply to its own particulars and not to those of other Forms. For example, there is no Form Not-Greek, only particulars of Form Otherness that somehow suppress Form Greek.

Regardless of whether Socrates meant the particulars of Otherness yield Not-Greek, Not-tall, Not-beautiful, etc., the particulars would operate specifically rather than generally, each somehow yielding only one exclusion.

Plato had postulated that we know Forms through a remembrance of the soul's past lives and Aristotle's arguments against this treatment of epistemology are compelling. For Plato, particulars somehow do not exist, and, on the face of it, "that which is non-existent cannot be known". See Metaphysics III 3–4.

Scholastic criticism
Nominalism (from Latin nomen, "name") says that ideal universals are mere names, human creations; the blueness shared by sky and blue jeans is a shared concept, communicated by our word "blueness". Blueness is held not to have any existence beyond that which it has in instances of blue things. This concept arose in the Middle Ages, as part of Scholasticism.

Scholasticism was a highly multinational, polyglottal school of philosophy, and the nominalist argument may be more obvious if an example is given in more than one language. For instance, colour terms are strongly variable by language; some languages consider blue and green the same colour, others have monolexemic terms for several shades of blue, which are considered different; other, like the Mandarin qing denote both blue and black. The German word "Stift" means a pen or a pencil, and also anything of the same shape. The English "pencil" originally meant "small paintbrush"; the term later included the silver rod used for silverpoint. The German "Bleistift" and "Silberstift" can both be called "Stift", but this term also includes felt-tip pens, which are clearly not pencils.

The shifting and overlapping nature of these concepts makes it easy to imagine them as mere names, with meanings not rigidly defined, but specific enough to be useful for communication. Given a group of objects, how is one to decide if it contains only instances of a single Form, or several mutually-exclusive Forms?

See also
 Archetype
 Analogy of the Divided Line
 Dmuta in Mandaeism
 Exaggerated realism
 Form of the Good
 Hyperuranion
 Jungian archetypes
 Map–territory relation
 Nominalism
 Platonic idealism
 Plotinus
 Problem of universals
 Substantial form
 Platonic solid
 Plato's unwritten doctrines, for debates over Forms and Plato's higher, esoteric theories

Notes

Dialogues that discuss Forms
The theory is presented in the following dialogues:

 Meno: 71–81, 85–86: The discovery (or "recollection") of knowledge as latent in the soul, pointing forward to the theory of Forms
 Phaedo
 73–80: The theory of recollection restated as knowledge of the Forms in soul before birth in the body,109–111: The myth of the afterlife, 100c: The theory of absolute beauty
 Symposium: 210–211: The archetype of Beauty.
 Phaedrus: 248–250: Reincarnation according to knowledge of the true, 265–266: The unity problem in thought and nature.
 Cratylus: 389–390: The archetype as used by craftsmen, 439–440: The problem of knowing the Forms.
 Theaetetus: 184–186: Universals understood by mind and not perceived by senses.
 Sophist: 246–259: True essence a Form. Effective solution to participation problem. The problem with being as a Form; if it is participatory then non-being must exist and be being.
 Parmenides: 129–135: Participatory solution of unity problem. Things partake of archetypal like and unlike, one and many, etc. The nature of the participation (Third man argument). Forms not actually in the thing. The problem of their unknowability.
 Republic
 Book III: 402–403: Education the pursuit of the Forms.
 Book V: 472–483: Philosophy the love of the Forms. The philosopher-king must rule.
 Books VI–VII: 500–517: Philosopher-guardians as students of the Beautiful and Just implement archetypical order, Metaphor of the Sun: The sun is to sight as Good is to understanding, Allegory of the Cave: The struggle to understand forms like men in cave guessing at shadows in firelight.
 Books IX–X, 589–599: The ideal state and its citizens. Extensive treatise covering citizenship, government and society with suggestions for laws imitating the Good, the True, the Just, etc. Metaphor of the three beds.
 Timaeus: 27–52: The design of the universe, including numbers and physics. Some of its patterns. Definition of matter.
 Philebus: 14-18: Unity problem: one and many, parts and whole.
 Seventh Letter: 342–345: The epistemology of Forms. The Seventh Letter is possibly spurious.

Bibliography
 
 
 
 
  Reviewed by 
 

Matía Cubillo,  Gerardo Óscar (2021). "Suggestions on How to Combine the Platonic Forms to Overcome the Interpretative Difficulties of the Parmenides Dialogue", Revista de Filosofía de la Universidad de Costa Rica, vol. 60, 156: 157–171.

External links

 
 
 
 

Idealism
Metaphysical theories
Platonism
Theories in ancient Greek philosophy